Pavle Velimirović (Cyrillic: Пaвлe Beлимиpoвић; born 11 April 1990, in Titograd) is a Montenegrin football goalkeeper who plays for Dečić Tuzi. In June 2014 he signed for Montenegrin First League side FK Zeta.

Playing career

Club
He started playing as a youngster in Montenegro in a local club FK Crvena Stijena where he was spotted by Serbian FK Partizan who brought him to play for their youth team.

In 2008, he signed with Hungarian club Kecskeméti TE where he made his senior debut. The club was newly promoted to the top league, and he finished the season with 3 appearances in the Hungarian Championship.

In summer 2009 he returned to Montenegro and signed with OFK Petrovac playing in the Montenegrin First League where he played during the following two seasons making 35 league appearances.

In July 2011, he joined Polish Ekstraklasa club ŁKS Łódź on a one-year contract.

In July 2013, he joined Maltese club Rabat Ajax F.C.

References

External links 
 
 

1990 births
Living people
Sportspeople from Cetinje
Association football goalkeepers
Montenegrin footballers
Montenegro youth international footballers
Montenegro under-21 international footballers
Kecskeméti TE players
OFK Petrovac players
ŁKS Łódź players
FC Etar 1924 Veliko Tarnovo players
Rabat Ajax F.C. players
FK Zeta players
FK Zvijezda 09 players
FK Lovćen players
FK Iskra Danilovgrad players
FK Dečić players
Nemzeti Bajnokság I players
Montenegrin First League players
Ekstraklasa players
First Professional Football League (Bulgaria) players
Maltese Premier League players
First League of the Republika Srpska players
Montenegrin Second League players
Montenegrin expatriate footballers
Expatriate footballers in Hungary
Montenegrin expatriate sportspeople in Hungary
Expatriate footballers in Poland
Montenegrin expatriate sportspeople in Poland
Expatriate footballers in Bulgaria
Montenegrin expatriate sportspeople in Bulgaria
Expatriate footballers in Malta
Montenegrin expatriate sportspeople in Malta